Rahman is an Arabic origin surname meaning "gracious", "King", "merciful" or "Lord". With nisba (Arabic onomastic), the name becomes Rahmani, means "descendant of the gracious one" and is also used as a surname. In Islam, Ar-Rahman (The Most Gracious) is one of the Names of God.

Arabic-language surnames